Most of the Norwegian counties and municipalities have their own flag. They are based on the respective coat of arms of the subdivision. However they are seldom used. Most public buildings and private homes use the National flag. Note: As of 2020, many municipalities and counties have been merged. Because of this many of the new regions do not have a current flag and instead the coat of arms will be used for the new regions until a flag is made.

=== Flags of the former counties ===

=== Flags and Coat of Arms of the current regions ===

Although Finnmark and Troms are officially merged, they still use their old county flags as the merging is disputed by locals and officials in Finnmark. The region of Trøndelag uses the old flag of Nord-Trøndelag as it has historical value and connection to king Olav II of Norway.

=== Flags of the municipalities ===

This is just a number of municipalities with their own flags, there are however many more municipalities that do use a flag.

==== Agder ====
Flags of municipalities in Agder county.

==== Innlandet ====
Flags of municipalities in Innlandet county.

==== Møre og Romsdal ====
Flags of municipalities in Møre og Romsdal county.

==== Nordland ====
Flags of municipalities in Nordland county.

==== Oslo ====

==== Rogaland ====
Flags of municipalities in Rogaland county.

==== Troms og Finnmark ====
Flags of municipalities in Troms og Finnmark county.

==== Trøndelag ====
Flags of municipalities in Trøndelag county.

==== Vestfold og Telemark ====
Flags of municipalities in Vestfold og Telemark county.

==== Vestland ====
Flags of municipalities in Vestland county.

==== Viken ====
Flags of municipalities in Viken county.

==== Former municipalities ====

Subdivisions
Lists and galleries of flags
Flags
Norway